
Herbert von Böckmann (24 July 1886 – 3 March 1974) was a German general during World War II who commanded the L Army Corps. He was a recipient of the Knight's Cross of the Iron Cross of Nazi Germany. Böckmann was discharged from the armed forces 31 March 1943 because of his age.

Awards and decorations

 Knight's Cross of the Iron Cross on 4 December 1941 as Generalleutnant and commander of 11. Infanterie Division

References

Citations

Bibliography

 

1886 births
1974 deaths
Military personnel from Bremen
German Army generals of World War II
Generals of Infantry (Wehrmacht)
German Army personnel of World War I
Recipients of the clasp to the Iron Cross, 1st class
Recipients of the Knight's Cross of the Iron Cross
Knights Grand Cross of the Order of Isabella the Catholic
Reichswehr personnel
Luftstreitkräfte personnel